Born of the Night was the second album of the band Midnight Syndicate, released in 1998.

Track listing 
 "Premonition" – 2:31
 "Darkness Descends" – 2:01
 "Born of the Night" – 3:14
 "Lost Souls" – 1:17
 "Dark Tower" – 3:16
 "The Apparition" – 1:07
 "Gargoyles" – 2:49
 "Lurking Fear" – 1:02
 "Shadows" – 3:05
 "Whispers" – 0:28
 "Solemn Reflections" – 2:48
 "Haunted Nursery" – 2:48
 "Woe" – 1:35
 "Masque of Sorrow" – 2:08
 "Requiem" – 2:58
 "Dungeon" – 0:58
 "Something Wicked" – 3:03
 "Vampire's Kiss" – 2:21
 "Nightstalker" – 2:43
 "Midnight" – 1:26
 "Forbidden Crypts" – 3:52

References

External links
 Album Info on Midnight Syndicate Band website
 

1998 albums
Midnight Syndicate albums